Elections to Liverpool City Council were held on 6 May 1976.  One third of the council was up for election and John Hamilton of the Labour party became Council Leader albeit with no overall control of the council.

After the election, the composition of the council was:

Election result

Ward results

* - Councillor seeking re-election

(PARTY) - Party of former Councillor

These election results are compared with the 1973 election results which were all up elections, with all three Councillors being elected for each ward. Those Councillors elected with the second highest number of votes for each ward were elected for a three-year term, finishing in 1976.

Abercromby, St. James'

Aigburth

Allerton

Anfield

Arundel

Breckfield, St. Domingo

Broadgreen

Central, Everton, Netherfield

Childwall

Church

Clubmoor

County

Croxteth

Dingle

Dovecot

Fairfield

Fazakerley

Gillmoss

Granby, Prince's Park

Kensington

Low Hill, Smithdown

Melrose, Westminster

Old Swan

Picton

Pirrie

St. Mary's

St. Michael's

Sandhills, Vauxhall

Speke

Tuebrook

Warbreck

Woolton, East

Woolton, West

By Elections

References

1976
1976 English local elections
1970s in Liverpool
May 1976 events in the United Kingdom